Spearmint, also known as garden mint, common mint, lamb mint and mackerel mint, is a species of mint, Mentha spicata (native to Europe and southern temperate Asia, extending from Ireland in the west to southern China in the east. It is naturalized in many other temperate parts of the world, including northern and southern Africa, North America, and South America. It is used as a flavouring in food and herbal teas. The aromatic oil, called oil of spearmint, is also used as a flavoring and sometimes as a scent.

The species and its subspecies have many synonyms, including Mentha crispa, Mentha crispata, and Mentha viridis.

Description

Spearmint is a perennial herbaceous plant. The stem is square-shaped, a defining characteristic of the mint family of herbs. Spearmint flowers in the summer (from July to September in the northern hemisphere), and has relatively large seeds, which measure . The name ''spear'' mint derives from the pointed leaf tips.

Mentha spicata varies considerably in leaf blade dimensions, the prominence of leaf veins, and pubescence.

Taxonomy
Mentha spicata was first described scientifically by Carl Linnaeus in 1753. The epithet spicata means 'bearing a spike'.  The species has two accepted subspecies, each of which has acquired a large number of synonyms:
Mentha spicata subsp. condensata (Briq.) Greuter & Burdet – eastern Mediterranean, from Italy to Egypt
Mentha spicata subsp. spicata – distribution as for the species as a whole

Origin and hybrids 
The plant is a allopolyploid species (2n = 48), which could be a result of hybridization and chromosome doubling. Mentha longifolia and Mentha suaveolens (2n = 24) are likely to be the contributing diploid species.

Mentha spicata hybridizes with other Mentha species, forming hybrids such as:

 Mentha × piperita (hybrid with Mentha aquatica), black peppermint, hairy peppermint
 Mentha × gracilis (hybrid with Mentha arvensis), Scotch spearmint
 Mentha × villosa (hybrid with Mentha suaveolens)

There are other cultivars:
Mentha spicata 'strawberry' - with a distinct strawberry odor.

History and domestication

Mention of spearmint dates back to at least the 1st century AD, with references from naturalist Pliny and mentions in the Bible. Further records show descriptions of mint in ancient mythology. Findings of early versions of toothpaste using mint in the 14th century suggest widespread domestication by this point. It was introduced into England by the Romans by the 5th century, and the "Father of British Botany", of the surname Turner, mentions mint as being good for the stomach. John Gerard's Herbal (1597) states that: "It is good against watering eyes and all manner of break outs on the head and sores. "It is applied with salt to the biting of mad dogs," and that "They lay it on the stinging of wasps and bees with good success."  He also mentions that "the smell rejoices the heart of man", for which reason they used to strew it in chambers and places of recreation, pleasure, and repose, where feasts and banquets are made."

Spearmint is documented as being an important cash crop in Connecticut during the period of the American Revolution, at which time mint tea was noted as being a popular drink due to it not being taxed.

Ecology 
Spearmint can readily adapt to grow in various types of soil. Spearmint tends to thrive with plenty of organic material in full sun to part shade. The plant is also known to be found in moist habitats such as swamps or creeks, where the soil is sand or clay.

Spearmint ideally thrives in soils that are deep, well-drained, moist, rich in nutrients and organic matter, and have a crumbly texture. The pH range should be between 6.0 and 7.5.

Diseases and pests

Fungal diseases 
Fungal diseases are common diseases in spearmint. Two main diseases are rust and leaf spot. Puccinia menthae is a fungus that causes the disease called "rust". Rust affects the leaves of spearmint by producing pustules inducing the leaves to fall off. Leaf spot is a fungal disease that occurs when Alternaria alernata is present on the spearmint leaves. The infection looks like circular dark spot on the top side of the leaf. Other fungi that cause disease in spearmint are Rhizoctonia solani, Verticillium dahliae, Phoma strasseri, and Erysiphe cischoracearum.

Nematode diseases 
Some nematode diseases in spearmint include root knot and root lesions. Nematode species that cause root knots in this plant are various Meloidogyne species. The other nematode species are Pratylenchus which cause root lesions.

Viral and phytoplasmal diseases 
Spearmint can be infected by tobacco ringspot virus. This virus can lead to stunted plant growth and deformation of the leaves in this plant. In China, spearmint have been seen with mosaic symptoms and deformed leaves. This is an indication that the plant can also be infected by the viruses, cucumber mosaic and tomato aspermy.

Cultivation and harvest

Spearmint grows well in nearly all temperate climates. Gardeners often grow it in pots or planters due to its invasive, spreading rhizomes.

Spearmint leaves can be used fresh, dried, or frozen. The leaves lose their aromatic appeal after the plant flowers. It can be dried by cutting just before, or right (at peak) as the flowers open, about one-half to three-quarters the way down the stalk (leaving smaller shoots room to grow). Some dispute exists as to what drying method works best; some prefer different materials (such as plastic or cloth) and different lighting conditions (such as darkness or sunlight). The leaves can also be preserved in salt, sugar, sugar syrup, alcohol, or oil.

Oil uses
Spearmint is used for its aromatic oil, called oil of spearmint. The most abundant compound in spearmint oil is R-(–)-carvone, which gives spearmint its distinctive smell. Spearmint oil also contains significant amounts of limonene, dihydrocarvone, and 1,8-cineol. Unlike oil of peppermint, oil of spearmint contains minimal amounts of menthol and menthone. It is used as a flavouring for toothpaste and confectionery, and is sometimes added to shampoos and soaps.

Traditional medicine 
Spearmint has been used in traditional medicine.

Insecticide and pesticide 
Spearmint essential oil has had success as a larvicide against mosquitoes. Using spearmint as a larvicide would be a greener alternative to synthetic insecticides due to their toxicity and negative effect to the environment.

Used as a fumigant, spearmint essential oil is an effective insecticide against adult moths.

Antimicrobial research
Spearmint has been used for its supposed antimicrobial activity, which may be related to carvone. Its in vitro antibacterial activity has been compared to that of amoxicillin, penicillin, and streptomycin. Spearmint oil is found to have higher activity against gram-positive bacteria compared to gram-negative bacteria in vitro, which may be due to differing sensitivities to oils.

Beverages
Spearmint leaves are infused in water to make spearmint tea. Spearmint is an ingredient of Maghrebi mint tea. Grown in the mountainous regions of Morocco, this variety of mint possesses a clear, pungent, but mild aroma. Spearmint is an ingredient in several mixed drinks, such as the mojito and mint julep. Sweet tea, iced and flavoured with spearmint, is a summer tradition in the Southern United States.

Gallery

References

External links 
 
 

spicata
Flora of Europe
Flora of temperate Asia
Essential oils
Garden plants
Herbs
Plants described in 1753